Hosam Naoum (born 1973) is a Anglican bishop in Jerusalem.

He was educated at Rhodes University and the Virginia Theological Seminary. He served at parishes in  Nablus, Zababdeh and Jerusalem. He was Canon Pastor at St. George's Cathedral, Jerusalem from 2005 to 2012. He was then its Dean until his consecration as Coadjutor bishop on 14 June 2020. He was installed as Archbishop in Jerusalem in 2021.

References

1973 births
Living people
Anglican bishops of Jerusalem
Palestinian Anglicans
21st-century Anglican bishops in the Middle East
Deans of Jerusalem
Virginia Theological Seminary alumni
Rhodes University alumni